Ayatollah Mohammad Mofatteh (‎; 1928–1979) was an Iranian philosopher, theologian, and political activist, born in Famenin, Hamadan, Iran. After he finished his primary education in Hamadan, he left for the Islamic Seminary in Qom, where he was taught by reputable teachers such as Ayatollah Muhammad Hujjat Kuh-Kamari, Ayatollah Sayyed Hossein Tabatabei Borujerdi, Grand Ayatollah Sayyid Ruhollah Mūsavi Khomeini, Ayatollah Mohammad-Reza Golpaygani, Ayatollah Marashi, and Allameh Tabatabie. He continued his studies at seminary and at the same time studied philosophy at Tehran University, where he earned his PhD and became a professor and a dean of colleague.

Mofatteh was a religio-political activist who worked for unity between the seminary and the academic disciplines. Also, he had an important role in fighting against the Shah's regime and in familiarizing the new generation with Islamic issues. He was a prayer leader in Javid and Qoba Mosque where he held and presided over religious and ideological sessions and organized political activities against the Shah. He performed the Eid al-Fitr prayer in Tehran in 1978, and his sermon led to the demonstrations of 7and 8December. His activities led to his arrest and exile by SAVAK on several occasions.

He was the author of several books such as Translation of Tafsir Kabir Majmaolbayan, The Way of Thought, and Outcomes of Imperialism, among others. He also wrote many articles such as "The Role of Muslim Scientists in The Advance of Science" and "Where Did Islamic Scientific Movements Begin?".

He was assassinated by four gunmen, all members of the Forqan group, in front of the Theology Department of Tehran University, on 18December 1979. He was shot four times, with the bullets going through his head, shoulder, hands, and knees. The day of his assassination is called the day for "unity among seminaries and universities" in Iran.

Early education 

He was born into a family of religious scholars. His father, Haj Sheikh Mahmoud Mofatteh, known as Mirza Mahmoud, was one of the eminent teachers of Hamadan Seminary. His father also was knowledgeable in subjects including Arabic and Persian literature. Mohammad used to participate in his father's courses, from which absorbed his primary knowledge.

Mohammad Mofatteh attended Akhund Mullah Ali Hamedani's school in Hamadan. After completing his primary education there, at 16 he left for the well-known Islamic Seminary in Qom, where he was taught by Ayatollah Muhammad Hujjat Kuh-Kamari, Ayatollah Sayyed Hossein Tabatabei Borujerdi and Grand Ayatollah Sayyid Ruhollah Mūsavi Khomeini, Ayatollah Mohammad-Reza Golpaygani, Ayatollah Marashi, and Allameh Tabatabie.

Activities

Political
Mofatteh and Beheshti were among those who articulated Khomeini's spiritual and political authority in the Islamic revolution. In other words, they extended the views of Khomeini in politics and ideology. As a religio-political activist, he used to travel to different places of Iran in the 1950s and 1960s. Especially, during Ramadhan, Moharram, and Safar, he used to go to Khuzestan province to guide the people. After he developed his activities in Khuzestan, SAVAK prohibited his entrance to the province. In 1968 he was fired from the Department of Education for his political activities and was exiled to Zahedan. After the period of exile was finished, SAVAK prohibited his entrance to Qom and instead, "to neutralize his religio-political activities", suggested that he be assigned as a professor at Tehran University.

In 1973, at the invitation of the people, he went to Javid Mosque in Tehran to lead the prayers. There, he held ideological classes on "the fundamentals of beliefs", philosophy, Tafsir of Quran, Nahj al-Balagha, history of religions, and sociology. He continued his activities in the Javid Mosque so that it became a center for fighting against the Shah, leading to its closing on 24November 1974 by SAVAK after Khamenei's speech there, and Mofatteh being sent to prison for almost two months. In 1976 he accepted the responsibility of managing Qoba Mosque in Tehran, where he introduced some innovations such as inviting Egyptian Quran reciters, and inviting Abdul Fatah Abdul Maqsood, the author of the book Ali. He established a library and an interest-free loan center in the mosque. After a while, he was prohibited from giving lectures. As an Islamist leader, Ayatollah Mofatteh organized demonstrations in the Qoba Mosque against the Shah's regime.

Mofatteh traveled to Lebanon and Syria and visited Imam Musa Sadr, with whom he aimed to help the Lebanese evacuees and lead cultural activities. During that trip, Musa Sadr and Mofatteh decided to establish a center where the children of evacuees could obtain an education from the primary grades up to the university level. They bought a piece of land for constructing the center but they did not carry out their plan after Sadr's disappearance.

Mofatteh performed the prayer of Eid al-Fitr in 1978 in Gheytarieh, in which an unprecedented number of people took part and which was marked as a "shining point in the history of the Islamic Revolution". After finishing the prayer, he gave a "very revolutionary and crucial" lecture, mentioned "Imam Khomeini", and emphasized the importance of respecting him. The lecture led to demonstrations of 7September (16th of Shahrivar). He was injured in the demonstration, arrested while returning home from the hospital, and then imprisoned for two months. After the demonstration, people promised to gather the next day on 8September at Jaleh (Shohada) Square which led to the Black Friday event.

He was a part of Khomeini's welcoming committee and was responsible for managing the affairs in Behesht-e Zahra. The committee organized 65,000 people as a disciplinary force to protect Khomeini. Mofatteh was one of the founders of the "Combatant Clergy Association", and was among those who joined secular organizations such as the Teachers Association in order to counter the influence of the Tudeh party, and to "advance their common cause against the state".

Academic
Mofatteh was studying at the university and teaching in the seminary at the same time, which garnered criticism from some people who told him, in a kind manner, that this was tarnishing his status. As the initiator of "seminary-university unity", he studied philosophy at the university and attended seminary in Qom. Then he became a professor at Tehran University and taught divine law and principles of philosophy at Qom seminary. Like his colleague Professor Motahari, he started to teach university students in 1969. He was experienced enough in teaching because he was a teacher at a high school in Qom as well. Along with Ayatollah Sayyed Mohammad Hossein Beheshti, he worked at the Religion and Knowledge high school in Qom, where they aimed to familiarize the new generation with Islam and seminary students with academic and scientific activities. Also, for this goal, Mofatteh established the Islamic Association of Students and Educators, in cooperation with Ayatollah Beheshti and Ayatollah Khamenei.

Works
He wrote many books, including Translation of Tafsir Kabir Majmaolbayan, The Way of Thought, and Outcomes of Imperialism. His doctoral dissertation was "Divine Wisdom in Nahj al-Balagha". He was concerned in the aforementioned essay with the relation of religion and philosophy.
Besides those, he authored many works in different fields of Islamic science as follows:
 A gloss on Hikmat Muta'aliyyeh
 The way of thought in logic
 The verses of beliefs in Quran
 Unity of academics and seminary
He published articles mainly in "Islam School" and "Shia School" magazines. Also, he published some other articles entitled "The Role of Muslim Scientists in The Advance of Science", "Where Did Islamic Scientific Movements Begin?", "Muslims' learning and research in Medicine", and "Research Method of Muslim Scientists" (all of the above articles were published by the Iranian Research Organization for Science and Technology in a collection entitled "The Role of Scientists in the Advance of Science").

Death

Assassination
Mofatteh was assassinated by Forghan group, for political reasons, when he was in front of the building of Theology department of Tehran University along with his two guards, Asghar Nematy and Javad Bahmany, on 18December 1979, when he was dean of the Theology Department. He was shot at four times, with the bullets going through his head, shoulder, hands, and knees. He was taken to Ayatollah Taleghany Hospital where he died on the same day. Four members of Forghan namely, Kamal Yassini, Mahmud Kashani, Mohammad Nouri, and Hassan Nouri, were charged in the assassination. Kamal Yasini, Mofatteh's assassin, a 20-year-old youth who held the responsibility of planning the groups terror, said that their previous terror attempts, including one at the Pars school, were unsuccessful and that he had aimed to perform the deed by himself.

Funeral
On the morning of 19 December Mofatteh's body, with those of his guards, was carried from the university's mosque, then carried to Qom and buried in the courtyard of the Fatemeh Ma'sumeh shrine.

Reception
December 18, the day Mofatteh was assassinated, is called the day for "unity among seminaries and universities".

See also 
Mohammad Beheshti
Morteza Motahhari
Mohammad-Javad Bahonar

Sources

External links
 Photo of prayer of Eid al-Fitr by Mofatteh 
 Mohammad Mofatteh, Al-Islam.org
 Photo and News of Mofatteh's assassination in the papers 

1928 births
1979 deaths
Iranian ayatollahs
Iranian writers
People from Hamadan Province
People of the Iranian Revolution
Combatant Clergy Association politicians
People assassinated by the Furqan Group
Deaths by firearm in Iran
Qom Seminary alumni
Burials at Fatima Masumeh Shrine